Chionanthus havilandii grows as a tree up to  tall, with a trunk diameter of up to . The bark is whitish. Inflorescences bear up to four pairs of fragrant yellow or white flowers. Its habitat is forest near streams. C. havilandii is endemic to the Sarawak region of Malaysian Borneo.

References

havilandii
Endemic flora of Borneo
Trees of Borneo
Flora of Sarawak
Plants described in 1980